The Good Schools Guide is a guide to British schools, both state and private.

Overview 
The guide is compiled by a team of editors which, according to the official website, "comprises some 50 editors, writers, researchers and contributors; mostly parents but some former headteachers." The website states that it is "written by parents for parents", and that the schools are not charged for entry in the Guide, nor can they pay to be included, though featured schools may advertise on the website or in the print versions. Since the first edition in 1986, the full Guide has been republished 22 times. The chief editor is Ralph Lucas.

Other publications produced by The Guide include The Good Schools Guide – Special Education Needs, The Good Schools Guide International, The Good Schools Guide London North, The Good Schools Guide London South and Uni in the USA.  An offshoot is the Good Schools Guide Education Consultants (formerly Advice Service) – a service for finding schools and offering educational or other advice to parents on a consultancy basis. The consultants are The Guide writers and other experts.

Style
The guide itself has a brisk, conversational and often irreverent style of review: the website states that because writers do not accept payment from the schools being reviewed, the guide is "in a position to be outspoken, to write and to advise [readers] impartially, without fear of being biased or having a conflict of loyalties." The Times Educational Supplement stated that the guide is "...untroubled by the sensibilities of schools and ... cavalier in the face of squawks from those it has offended".

Reviews
The Daily Telegraph reviewed the guide in the following terms: "Unique among the many guides available, it sets out to give frank answers to the questions every parent asks." Similarly, the Financial Times called the guide "one of the best aids for parents...informative and witty." The FT has also described the Guide as "one of Britain's leading guides to schools". The Guardian repeatedly describes the Guide as "the bible for middle-class school choice"

International
The Good Schools Guide International (GSGI) is an online resource also edited by the guide with details of international schools in over 35 countries. The GSGI is aimed at English-speaking parents resident outside the UK who want an international education for their children.

References

External links
 

Publications established in 1986
1986 establishments in the United Kingdom
Education in the United Kingdom
British non-fiction books
Books about education
Series of non-fiction books
British educational websites